Robert M. Long was a member of the Wisconsin State Assembly.

Biography
Long was born on April 9, 1895 in Westfield, Wisconsin. He died in October 1977.

Career
Long was a member of the Assembly from 1939 to 1946. Additionally, he was Chairman (similar to Mayor) of Westfield, Marquette County, Wisconsin and of the Marquette County, Wisconsin Board of Supervisors. He was a Republican.

References

See also
The Political Graveyard

People from Westfield, Marquette County, Wisconsin
Republican Party members of the Wisconsin State Assembly
Mayors of places in Wisconsin
County supervisors in Wisconsin
1895 births
1977 deaths
20th-century American politicians